Milo Goodrich (January 3, 1814 – April 15, 1881) was a United States Representative from New York. Born in East Homer, Cortland County, he moved with his parents to Cortlandville in 1816. He attended the South Cortland district school, Cortland Academy (in Homer) and Oberlin College in Ohio. He taught school in New York, Pennsylvania, and Ohio, studied law, was admitted to the bar in Worcester, Massachusetts in 1840, and practiced for two years in Beloit, Wisconsin. He returned to New York and settled in Dryden in 1844. He was postmaster of Dryden from October 2, 1849 to June 25, 1853 and was a member of the New York Constitutional Convention in 1867 and 1868.

Goodrich was elected as a Republican to the Forty-second Congress, holding office from March 4, 1871 to March 3, 1873. He was an unsuccessful candidate for reelection in 1872 to the Forty-third Congress, and resumed the practice of law. He moved to Auburn, New York in 1875 and continued the practice of law; he died there in 1881. Interment was in Green Hills Cemetery, Dryden.

He is the great-great-great-grandfather of U.S. Secretary of Education Arne Duncan.

References

External links

1814 births
1881 deaths
People from Homer, New York
Politicians from Beloit, Wisconsin
Massachusetts lawyers
New York (state) lawyers
Wisconsin lawyers
New York (state) postmasters
Oberlin College alumni
Republican Party members of the United States House of Representatives from New York (state)
People from Cortland County, New York
People from Dryden, New York
19th-century American politicians
19th-century American lawyers
Schoolteachers from New York (state)
Schoolteachers from Pennsylvania
Schoolteachers from Ohio
19th-century American educators